"Soul Searchin'" is a song by American musician and singer-songwriter Glenn Frey, a member of the Eagles. It was released as a single from his third solo studio album of the same name in 1989.  The single features the non-album track, "It's Cold in Here" as the B-side, which was also released as a bonus track on compact disc release of the album.

Unlike the album, the single was a success peaking at No. 5 on the Adult Contemporary chart, but failed to peak on any other chart.

Background
In the liner notes to the original album Glenn Frey wrote of the song "Here's the message, folks. You can't change the world but you can change yourself. Coach John Wooden said you shouldn't concern yourself with people's perception of you but rather concern yourself with your character which is the true measure of who and what you are. I buy that."

Personnel 
 Glenn Frey – lead vocals, keyboards, string arrangements
 Barry Beckett – keyboards
 Steve Nathan – keyboards
 Steve Thoma – keyboards
 Duncan Cameron – guitars, backing vocals 
 David Hood – bass 
 Roger Hawkins – drums
 Ralph MacDonald – percussion
 Nick DeCaro – string arrangements
 Oren Waters – backing vocals 
 Institutional Radio Choir – choir
 Carl Williams – choir director

References

External links

1989 singles
Glenn Frey songs
MCA Records singles
Songs written by Jack Tempchin
Songs written by Glenn Frey
1988 songs